Dee Island is the ice-free island lying between Greenwich Island and Aitcho Islands in the South Shetland Islands, Antarctica and is separated from Greenwich Island to the south by the  wide Orión Passage and from Aitcho Islands to the northeast by the  wide Villalón Passage. The area was visited by 19th century sealers.

Dee Island was charted and named, probably from its shape, by Discovery Investigations in 1935, while Montufar Island is named after a member of the Second Ecuadorian Antarctic Expedition who had an accident during the building of Pedro Vicente Maldonado Base.

Location

See also
 Aitcho Islands
 Composite Gazetteer of Antarctica
 Greenwich Island
 SCAR
 Territorial claims in Antarctica

Map

 L.L. Ivanov et al. Antarctica: Livingston Island and Greenwich Island, South Shetland Islands. Scale 1:100000 topographic map. Sofia: Antarctic Place-names Commission of Bulgaria, 2005.

References

External links
 SCAR Composite Antarctic Gazetteer.

Islands of the South Shetland Islands